Yan Gras (born 7 January 1996) is a French cyclist, who competes in cyclo-cross for UCI Cyclo-cross Pro Team Podiocom CC and for French amateur team SCO Dijon on the road.

Major results

2012–2013
 3rd National Junior Championships
2013–2014
 1st Grand Prix Möbel Alvisse Juniors
 Challenge la France Juniors
1st Flamanville
3rd Saint-Etienne-lès-Remiremont
 3rd  UEC European Junior Championships
2014–2015
 1st Nommay Under-23
2015–2016
 3rd Overall Under-23 Coupe de France
2017–2018
 UCI Under-23 World Cup
2nd Nommay
 3rd  UCI Under-23 World Championships
 3rd Overall Under-23 Coupe de France
1st Jablines
1st Flamanville
2021–2022
 2nd National Championships
 2nd La Grandville
2nd Dijon

References

External links

1996 births
Living people
French male cyclists
Cyclo-cross cyclists